His Blind Power is a 1913 silent film drama short directed by Romaine Fielding. It starred Fielding and Mary Ryan and was produced by the Lubin Manufacturing Company.

Cast
Romaine Fielding - 
Mary Ryan
Billie Brockwell - (*billed as Lillian Brockwell)
Gladys Brockwell
Edmund Cobb -
Maurice Cytron -
Jack Ellis -
Eleanor Mason -
Jesse Robinson -

References

External links
 His Blind Power at IMDb.com

1913 films
American silent short films
1913 short films
Films directed by Romaine Fielding
Lubin Manufacturing Company films
American black-and-white films
Silent American drama films
1913 drama films
1910s American films